Santo Ângelo is a municipality located in northwestern Rio Grande do Sul state, Brazil. It has about 77,568 inhabitants (according to 2020 IBGE estimate) and the total area of the municipality is about 679 km². It borders Giruá to the north, and Entre-Ijuís to the south—it's linked to Santo Ângelo by the state road RS 344. The city is located 443 km (275 mi) from the state capital, Porto Alegre.

The local agriculture-economy produces and deals soy, corn, wheat, swine, sheep and cattle. Tourism in the city is primarily associated with the city's Jesuit history and the Jesuit Reductions in the nearby city São Miguel das Missões. The Angelopolitan Cathedral in downtown Santo Ângelo is the seat of the Roman Catholic Diocese of Santo Ângelo.

The city is served by Sepé Tiaraju Airport and is home to three institutions of higher education, Universidade Regional Integrada do Alto Uruguai e das Missões (URI), Faculdade CNEC Santo Ângelo and Instituto Federal Farroupilha (IFFar).

History
Santo Ângelo was founded on August 12, 1706 by the Belgium Jesuit Diego de Haze. The original name of Santo Ângelo was "Santo Ángel Custodio" (in Spanish) and then "Santo Ângelo Custódio."  The Reduction of Santo Ângelo was dedicated to "Anjo Custódio das Missões", the guard and protector of the missionaries or Jesuits.

The Angelopolitana Cathedral in Santo Ângelo, Rio Grande do Sul, was built in the 1920s on the same spot as the Santo Ângelo reduction built by Jesuits and the Guarani in the 18th century—the Cathedral is modeled after the ancient São Miguel das Missões mission also known as São Miguel Arcanjo.

Regional minority languages 
 Riograndenser Hunsrückisch German (Germanic origin)
 Mbyá Guaraní language (autochthonous)

Notable people 
 Carlos María de Alvear (1789-1852), soldier and statesman
 José Goldemberg (born 1928), physicist 
 Luiz Henrique Santos (born 1987), footballer

References

External links

 

 
Municipalities in Rio Grande do Sul
Populated places established in 1706
1706 establishments in Brazil